Back O'Loch Halt railway station on the Edinburgh and Glasgow Railway built Campsie Branch served part of Kirkintilloch in Scotland.

History 
Opened by the London and North Eastern Railway to counter growing road competition, the timber built station passed to the Scottish Region of British Railways on nationalisation in 1948, and was then closed by the British Railways Board on 7 September 1964.

The site today 
The station site was still visible but all traces have been removed as a result of the construction of the Kirkintilloch link road which opened in late 2010.  At this section the link road follows the route of the Campsie Branch and utilises much of the original cuttings and embankments.

References

Notes

Sources
 
 
 Back O'Loch Halt on navigable 1946 O. S. map The southerly of the two Kirkintilloch stations
 Back O' Loch Halt on Geograph

External links
 Photographs of Campsie Branch including the halt
 RAILSCOT Back O' Loch Halt

Disused railway stations in East Dunbartonshire
Railway stations in Great Britain opened in 1925
Railway stations in Great Britain closed in 1964
Former London and North Eastern Railway stations
Beeching closures in Scotland